The 1942 Fresno State Bulldogs football teamrepresented Fresno State Normal School—now known as California State University, Fresno—during the 1942 college football season.

Fresno State competed in the California Collegiate Athletic Association (CCAA). The team was led by seventh-year head coach James Bradshaw and played home games at Ratcliffe Stadium on the campus of Fresno City College in Fresno, California. They finished the season as champions of the CCAA, with a record of nine wins and one loss (9–1, 2–0 CCAA). The Bulldogs outscored their opponents 362–45 for the season, including shutting out their opponents seven times.

Schedule

Team players in the NFL
The following Fresno State Bulldog players were selected in the 1944 NFL Draft.

Notes

References

Fresno State
Fresno State Bulldogs football seasons
California Collegiate Athletic Association football champion seasons
Fresno State Bulldogs football